Phlaocyon annectens is an extinct species of the genus Phlaocyon, belonging to the subfamily Borophaginae and tribe Phlaocyonini, a canid endemic to central and western North America from the Late Oligocene to Early Miocene living 24.6—20.8 mya and existed for approximately .

Taxonomy
Its type locality is Beardog Hill, which is in a Harrisonian fluvial sandstone in the Upper Harrison Beds Formation of Nebraska.

Morphology

Body mass
 estimated the body mass of two specimens to be .

Fossil distribution
Castolon (TMM 40635), Brewster County, Texas ~24.8—20.6 Ma.
American Museum-Cook Quarry, Sioux County, Nebraska ~24.8—20.6 Ma.
Van Tassel, Niobrara County, Wyoming ~24.8—20.6 Ma.
Beardog Hill, Upper Harrison Beds Formation, Sioux County, Nebraska ~24.8—20.6 Ma.

References

Notes

Sources

 
Martin, L.D. 1989. Fossil history of the terrestrial carnivora. Pages 536 - 568 in J.L. Gittleman, editor. Carnivore Behavior, Ecology, and Evolution, Vol. 1. Comstock Publishing Associates: Ithaca.
 
 

Borophagines
Oligocene canids
Miocene canids
Oligocene species first appearances
Aquitanian species extinctions